The 2016 season marks Glamorgan County Cricket Club's 129th year of existence and its 95th as a first-class cricket county. In 2016, Glamorgan is playing in the Second Division of the County Championship, and the South Groups of both the 50-over Royal London One-Day Cup and the NatWest t20 Blast. It is the first season in charge for head coach Robert Croft. The club captain is overseas player Jacques Rudolph. Unlike other counties, Glamorgan is competing in limited-overs cricket without a nickname for the fourth year in a row.

Squad
 No. denotes the player's squad number, as worn on the back of their shirt.
  denotes players with international caps.
  denotes a player who has been awarded a county cap.
 Ages given as of the first day of the County Championship season, 17 April 2016.

County Championship
In 2016 Glamorgan will play in Division Two of the County Championship.

Royal London One-Day Cup

NatWest t20 Blast

Pre-season friendlies

References

External links
Glamorgan home at ESPNcricinfo

2016
2016 in English cricket
2016 in Welsh sport
Welsh cricket in the 21st century
Seasons in Welsh cricket